Alf Murray (25 December 1915 – 12 March 1999) was an Irish Gaelic footballer who played as a right wing-forward at senior level for the Armagh county team.

Murray joined the team during the 1935 championship and was a regular member of the starting fifteen for the next decade. He failed to win any silverware at senior level, however, he did win an Ulster medal at junior level in 1935.

Murray had a lengthy club career with Clann Éireann.

In retirement from playing Murray was involved in the administration of the GAA. He was secretary of the Armagh County Board and chairman of the Ulster Council, before serving as president of the GAA from 1964 to 1967.

Education
Murray was awarded a teacher training scholarship to St Mary’s College of Education, Strawberry Hill, London.

Teaching
He taught for a short time in Newry and Derrymacash before spending 40 years at Tannaghmore Primary School where he was to become Vice Principal and Principal.

References

 

1915 births
1999 deaths
Alumni of St Mary's University, Twickenham
Armagh County Board administrators
Armagh inter-county Gaelic footballers
Chairmen of Gaelic games governing bodies 
Clann Éireann Gaelic footballers
Gaelic games players from County Down
Heads of schools in Northern Ireland
People from County Down
Presidents of the Gaelic Athletic Association
Secretaries of county boards of the Gaelic Athletic Association
Ulster inter-provincial Gaelic footballers
Ulster Provincial Council administrators